is a railway station in the city of Yonezawa, Yamagata Prefecture, Japan, operated by East Japan Railway Company (JR East).

Lines
Tōge Station is served by the Ōu Main Line, and is located 28.8 rail kilometers from the terminus of the line at Fukushima Station.

Station layout
The station has a single island platform connected to the station building by a level crossing. The station is located within a snow shelter, as it is located in a region of very heavy snowfalls in winter. The station is unattended.

Platforms

History
Tōge Station began as a signal stop on 15 May 1899 and was elevated to a full passenger station on 1 August 1899. The station was absorbed into the JR East network upon the privatization of JNR on 1 April 1987.

Surrounding area
The station is surrounded by wooded hills.

See also
List of Railway Stations in Japan

References

External links

 JR East station information 

Stations of East Japan Railway Company
Railway stations in Yamagata Prefecture
Ōu Main Line
Railway stations in Japan opened in 1899
Yonezawa, Yamagata